Arthur Leonard "Red" Swanson (born October 15, 1936) is a former Major League Baseball pitcher.

Swanson graduated from Neville High School in Monroe, Louisiana and later went to Louisiana State University.

His father, A. L. Swanson, coached both baseball and basketball at Louisiana State University in Baton Rouge.

References

External links

1936 births
Living people
Major League Baseball pitchers
Pittsburgh Pirates players
Columbus Jets players
Lincoln Chiefs players
Columbus/Gastonia Pirates players
Salt Lake City Bees players
Asheville Tourists players
Macon Peaches players
Baseball players from Baton Rouge, Louisiana
Sportspeople from Monroe, Louisiana
LSU Tigers baseball players